Winds are often used to measure intensity as they commonly cause notable impacts over large areas, and most popular tropical cyclone scales are organized around sustained wind speeds. However, variations in the averaging period of winds in different basins make inter-comparison difficult. In addition, other impacts like rainfall, storm surge, area of wind damage, and tornadoes can vary significantly in storms with similar wind speeds. Pressure is often used to compare tropical cyclones because the measurements are easier and use consistent methodology. Tropical cyclones can attain some of the lowest pressures over large areas on Earth. However, although there is a strong connection between lowered pressures and higher wind speeds, storms with the lowest pressures may not have the highest wind speeds, as each storm's relationship between wind and pressure is slightly different.

In the most recent and reliable records, most tropical cyclones which attained a pressure of 900 hPa (mbar) (26.56 inHg) or less have occurred in the Western North Pacific Ocean. The strongest tropical cyclone recorded worldwide, as measured by minimum central pressure, was Typhoon Tip, which reached a pressure of 870 hPa (25.69 inHg) on October 12, 1979.

The data below are subdivided by basin. Data listed are provided by the official Regional Specialized Meteorological Centre, unless otherwise noted. On October 23, 2015, Hurricane Patricia attained the strongest 1 minute sustained winds on record at 215 mph (345 km/h).

North Atlantic Ocean

The most intense storm in the North Atlantic by lowest pressure was Hurricane Wilma. The strongest storm by 1-minute sustained winds was Hurricane Allen.

Storm information has been compiled back to 1851, though measurements were rarer until aircraft reconnaissance started in the 1940s, and inexact estimates were still predominant until dropsondes were implemented in the 1970s.

See List of Category 5 Atlantic Hurricanes for additional information on strong storms in the Atlantic basin.

See Notable non-tropical pressures over the North Atlantic for intense extratropical low pressure values over the North Atlantic.

Eastern Pacific Ocean

The most intense storm in the Eastern Pacific Ocean by both sustained winds and central pressure was Hurricane Patricia. Its sustained winds of 345 km/h (215 mph) are also the highest on record globally.

Storms with a minimum central pressure of 925 hPa (27.32 inHg) or less are listed. Storm information was less reliably documented and recorded before 1949, and most storms since are only estimated because landfalls (and related reconnaissance) are less common in this basin.

See Category 5 Pacific Hurricanes for a full list of category 5 hurricanes in this basin.

Western North Pacific Ocean

The most intense storm by lowest pressure and peak 10-minute sustained winds was Typhoon Tip, which was also the most intense tropical cyclone ever recorded in terms of minimum central pressure.

Storms with a minimum pressure of 900 hPa (26.58 inHg) or less are listed. Storm information was less reliably documented and recorded before 1950.

North Indian Ocean

 

South-West Indian Ocean

The most intense tropical cyclone in the South-West Indian Ocean was Cyclone Gafilo. By 10-minute sustained wind speed, the strongest tropical cyclone in the South-West Indian Ocean was Cyclone Fantala.

Storms with an intensity of 920 hPa (27.17 inHg) or less are listed.  Storm information was less reliably documented and recorded before 1985.

Australian region

The most intense tropical cyclone(s) in the Australian Region were cyclones Gwenda and Inigo. By 10-minute sustained wind speed, the strongest were Cyclone Orson, Cyclone Monica and Cyclone Marcus.

Storms with an intensity of 920 hPa (27.17 inHg) or less are listed. Storm information was less reliably documented and recorded before 1985.

South Pacific Ocean

A total of 16 cyclones are listed down below reaching/surpassing an intensity of 920 hPa (27.17 inHg), with most of them occurring during El Niño seasons. Tropical cyclones that have been recorded since the start of the 1969–70 Tropical Cyclone year and have reached their peak intensity to the west of 160E are included in the list. The most intense tropical cyclone in the south Pacific, Cyclone Winston of 2016, is also the most intense storm in the Southern Hemisphere.

South Atlantic Ocean

Until recently, it was not known that tropical cyclones could exist in the southern Atlantic.  However, Hurricane Catarina in 2004, to date the only hurricane in the south Atlantic, brought additional review.  A subsequent study found that there was an average of 1-2 subtropical or tropical cyclones per year in the Southern Atlantic in recent decades.
No official database of South Atlantic cyclones exists, but a partial list of notable tropical and subtropical systems is listed.

See also

 Atlantic hurricane season
 Australian region tropical cyclone
 List of wettest tropical cyclones
 North Indian Ocean tropical cyclone
 Notable non-tropical pressures over the North Atlantic
 Pacific hurricane
 Pacific typhoon season
 South Atlantic tropical cyclone
 South Pacific tropical cyclone
 South-West Indian Ocean tropical cyclone

Notes

References

External links
Regional Specialized Meteorological Centers
 US National Hurricane Center – North Atlantic, Eastern Pacific
 Central Pacific Hurricane Center  – Central Pacific
 Japan Meteorological Agency – North West Pacific
 India Meteorological Department – North Indian Ocean
 Météo-France – La Reunion – South-West Indian Ocean from 30°E to 90°E
 Fiji Meteorological Service – South Pacific west of 160°E, north of 25° S

Tropical Cyclone Warning Centers
 Indonesian Meteorological Department – South Indian Ocean from 90°E to 125°E, north of 10°S
 Australian Bureau of Meteorology (TCWC's Perth, Darwin & Brisbane)  – South Indian Ocean & South Pacific Ocean from 90°E to 160°E, south of 10°S
 Meteorological Service of New Zealand Limited – South Pacific west of 160°E, south of 25°S

Intense
Tropical cyclones